Ali Jawad Al Taher (1911?/1922? – 10 October 1996) was an Iraqi critic and literary scholar. He was born and raised in Hilla, Iraq. He received a PhD from Sorbonne University in 1954, and published numerous critical studies during his lifetime. He won the inaugural Al Owais Award in the "Criticism & Literary Studies" category in 1988–89.

Selected works
 Arabic Poetry in Iraq and Persia in the Seljuk Era
 The Son and Seven Other Stories
 The Lamiya of Al Tughrai
 Al Tughrai
 Modern Iraqi Fiction
 Teaching Arabic
 Mahmoud Ahmad Al Sayed
 Observations on the Simplified Arabic Encyclopaedia
 Literary Research Methods
 Al Khouraimi: Poems
 Al Jawahiri: Poems
 Al Tughrai: Poems
 Beyond the Literary Horizon
 Encyclopedia of Arabic Publications
 Modern Stories and Plays

References

1922 births
1996 deaths
Iraqi critics
Iraqi literary historians
People from Hillah
Paris-Sorbonne University alumni
Iraqi expatriates in France